Croxteth is a Liverpool City Council Ward in the Liverpool West Derby Parliamentary constituency. The population of the ward at the 2011 census was 14,561. The ward boundary was changed in 2004 when the number of councillors was reduced. The pre 2004 Croxteth ward was essentially West Derby village, whereas the post 2004 ward was based on the Croxteth 'Council' estate and the Croxteth Country Park estate.

Councillors

 indicates seat up for re-election after boundary changes.

 indicates seat up for re-election.

 indicates change in affiliation.

 indicates seat up for re-election after casual vacancy.

Election results

Elections of the 2010s

Following the death of Cllr Rose Bailey  and the resignation of Cllr Phil Moffat a dual by-election was held on 18 November 2010. Two candidates were returned:

Elections of the 2000s

After the boundary change of 2004 the whole of Liverpool City Council faced election. Three Councillors were returned.

• italics – Denotes sitting Councillor.

• bold – Denotes the winning candidate

References

External links
Ward Profile – Croxteth

Wards of Liverpool